Niels Mestdagh (born 3 January 1993) is a Belgian footballer who plays for KFC Mandel United.

References

External links

Niels Mestdagh at Footballdatabase

1993 births
Living people
Belgian footballers
Cercle Brugge K.S.V. players
K.V.V. Coxyde players
Belgian Pro League players
Challenger Pro League players
Association football defenders
Royal FC Mandel United players